Byron Ritchie (born April 24, 1977) is a Canadian former professional ice hockey forward. He was born in Burnaby, British Columbia, and grew up in North Delta, British Columbia. Ritchie saw action in a total of 332 games in the NHL and also played in Sweden, Switzerland and Belarus.

Playing career
As a youth, Ritchie played in the 1990 and 1991 Quebec International Pee-Wee Hockey Tournaments with a minor ice hockey team from North Delta.

Ritchie was drafted in the 7th round (165th overall) by the Hartford Whalers in the 1995 NHL Entry Draft, from the Lethbridge Hurricanes. He was named to the Western Hockey League East Second All-Star Team in 1996 and 1997. 

On May 13, 1997, after a major junior game in the Memorial Cup refereed by a Francophone from Quebec, he was caught by an RDS camera yelling: "Fuck you, you fucking Frogs! Fuck them all!" He apologized the next day at practice stating "Whether the camera was on me or not doesn't make it right." For the remainder of the tournament, he was booed mercilessly by the fans in Hull, Quebec, where the tournament was taking place.

His rights transferred to the Carolina Hurricanes when the Whalers franchise relocated in 1997. On December 21, 1998, Ritchie made his NHL debut with the Hurricanes against the Buffalo Sabres. On October 26, 2001, he set a Lowell Lock Monsters franchise record for points in a game with six (2 goals, 4 assists). He was named the American Hockey League Player of the Week on October 29, 2001. 

On January 16, 2002, he was traded to the Florida Panthers with Sandis Ozolinsh for Bret Hedican, Tomas Malec, Kevyn Adams and a conditional 2nd round selection in the 2003 NHL Entry Draft. On July 4, 2004, he was signed as an unrestricted free agent by the Calgary Flames. On July 2, 2007, Ritchie signed with the Vancouver Canucks, where he played for one season.

After the Canucks chose not to re-sign him, he signed as a free agent to play in Europe for Geneve-Servette HC of the NLA and signed a one-year contract. After a very good season in Switzerland during which he earned 60 points and took the fifth place of the overall top-scorer rankings, Ritchie, again a free agent, decided to sign with the Dinamo Minsk of the Russian KHL. In the 2009–10 season, Bryon was hampered by injury and played in just 12 games posting 3 goals for Minsk.

On June 14, 2010, Ritchie remained in Europe and signed a one-year contract to return to Sweden with Modo of the SEL. After a single season in Sweden, Ritchie signed to return to the Swiss NLA with SC Bern for the 2011–12 season. He won the Swiss championship with Bern in 2013.

After four seasons with Bern, finished the 2014–15 season as team captain, Ritchie left the NLA and signed for a second spell with Modo Hockey of the SHL on May 10, 2015. He announced his retirement in March 2017.

Career statistics

Awards and honours

References

External links

 Stats & Bio from The Hockey News

1977 births
Living people
Beast of New Haven players
Calgary Flames players
Canadian expatriate ice hockey players in Belarus
Canadian expatriate ice hockey players in Sweden
Canadian expatriate ice hockey players in Switzerland
Canadian ice hockey centres
Carolina Hurricanes players
Cincinnati Cyclones (IHL) players
Florida Panthers players
Genève-Servette HC players
Hartford Whalers draft picks
HC Dinamo Minsk players
Ice hockey people from British Columbia
Lethbridge Hurricanes players
Lowell Lock Monsters players
Modo Hockey players
People from Delta, British Columbia
Rögle BK players
San Antonio Rampage players
SC Bern players
Sportspeople from Burnaby
Springfield Falcons players
Vancouver Canucks players